William Rea (born 3 February 1952) is an Austrian athlete. He competed in the men's long jump at the 1980 Summer Olympics.

References

1952 births
Living people
Athletes (track and field) at the 1980 Summer Olympics
Austrian male long jumpers
Olympic athletes of Austria
Place of birth missing (living people)